Ahmed Rami (born 12 December 1946) is a Moroccan-Swedish writer, political activist, coup d'etat participant, military officer and Holocaust denier. He gained attention as the founder of the radio station Radio Islam, which now functions as a website.

Biography
Rami was born in Tafraout, Morocco, the son of a Berber sheikh. While attending the école normale supérieure in Casablanca, Rami joined the National Union of Popular Forces. After graduating in June 1963, Rami taught history, geography, French and Arabic at secondary schools in Casablanca. In autumn 1965, Rami enrolled in the Royal Military Academy in Meknes with the intention — as an officer — of becoming more effective in his opposition to the regime. Following the arrest and disappearance of Mehdi Ben Barka, Rami became resolved "to enter the system in order to destroy it." Rami became a tank lieutenant in the Royal Moroccan Army and claims to have had close ties with general Mohamed Oufkir. Convinced that the King of Morocco Hassan II was a puppet of Jews and the Central Intelligence Agency (CIA), Rami participated in the 1972 Moroccan coup attempt. He sought and obtained political asylum in Sweden in 1973.

In 1987, Rami began using a public access Swedish radio station to broadcast Radio Islam, ostensibly a public relations program for Sweden's Muslims. The content of the shows, however, focused on Jews, and the station was accused of being a vehicle for antisemitism. In 1989, "Rami was charged by the Swedish Chancellor of Justice with hate speech (hets mot folkgrupp)." The charge was based in particular on programs aired on Radio Islam but also on passages of his book Vad är Israel? ("What is Israel?"). Rami was sentenced to six months imprisonment in 1990, and Radio Islam's transmission permit was revoked for a year. The station resumed broadcasting in 1991 under the direction of David Janzon; however, in 1993, Janzon was convicted of the same crime. In March 1992, Robert Faurisson visited Sweden at the invitation of Rami and was interviewed in two Radio Islam broadcasts. Rami was a featured speaker at the annual conference of the Institute for Historical Review, an organization which promotes Holocaust denial, in 1992. Radio Islam was off the air from 1993 to 1995, but the program returned in 1996 under Rami's direction, the same year that he established the Radio Islam website.

In October 2000, Rami was again convicted and fined by a Swedish court. Rami has been investigated for hate crimes in France and Sweden for his role in maintaining the Radio Islam website. The latest investigation ended in 2004 when the Swedish prosecutor was unable to prove that Rami was responsible for the content. According to Rami a "group of youngsters" was in charge of the website. He did not provide any names. On 25 November 2006, Rami was a guest lecturer at a convention of the Swedish National Socialist Front and the group distributed his books on their website. Rami also distributed NSF's own pamphlets and books.

Bibliography
 Vad är Israel? ("What is Israel?") (1988) 
 Ett liv för frihet ("A life for freedom") (1989), autobiography 
 Israels makt i Sverige ("Israel's power in Sweden") (1989) 
 Judisk häxprocess i Sverige ("Jewish witch hunt in Sweden") (1990) 
 Tabubelagda tankar ("Tabooed thoughts") (2005)

References

External links
 Ahmed Rami´s personal homepage, and own publishing company Kultur Förlag
 Radio Islam´s website
 Radio Islam different website
 Holocaust Denial— Ahmed Rami, from Poisoning the Web: Hatred Online by the Anti-Defamation League

1946 births
Swedish Holocaust deniers
Living people
Berber writers
Moroccan emigrants to Sweden
People convicted of hate crimes
People from Tafraout
Moroccan Army officers
Moroccan exiles
Berber Moroccans
20th-century Moroccan people
21st-century Moroccan people
21st-century Moroccan writers
21st-century Swedish writers
National Union of Popular Forces politicians
Moroccan military officers
Swedish Muslims
Swedish people of Moroccan-Berber descent
Shilha people
Antisemitism in Sweden